Khalid Al Merreikhi (Arabic:خالد المريخي; born 1968) is a Qatari retired football player. He played for the Qatar national team but is best known for his time with Al Sadd.

He started his career in Al Tadamun. After the temporary dissolution of the Qatari Second Division in 1989, he moved to Al Sadd. Future star Fahad Al Kuwari also made the transition to Al Sadd alongside him. They were both considered the most prominent players to have transferred from the Second Division.

He scored the winning goal in the final of the 1994 Emir Cup final.

References

1968 births
Living people
Qatari footballers
Qatar international footballers
Al Sadd SC players
Umm Salal SC players
Qatar Stars League players
Association football midfielders